Hustadvika is a  long section of coastline in Fræna Municipality in Romsdal, Møre og Romsdal county, Norway.  It is located in the shipping route between the towns of Molde and Kristiansund. Unlike most of the Norwegian coast, there are no larger islands sheltering waves.  The area is shallow and has many little islands and reefs, so ships have to go outside in open ocean. The area includes the waters off of village of Bud and the Bjørnsund islands in the southwest and off the village of Hustad and Kvitholmen in the northeast.

This is considered one of the most dangerous parts of the Norwegian coast, and many ships have been wrecked along it.

References

External links
Map of coast and underwater features
  – Gulesider has nautical charts

Hustadvika (municipality)
Fræna
Landforms of Møre og Romsdal
Coasts of Norway